Tómnat, Gaelic-Irish female given name.

Bearers of the name

 Tómnat bean Ferchair, died 695.

External links
 http://medievalscotland.org/kmo/AnnalsIndex/Feminine/Uasal.shtml

Irish-language feminine given names